The First Magdalena massacre was an attack by Seri Native Americans against the Spanish mission village of Magdalena de Kino, in the present day northern Mexico. The attack occurred on November 3, 1757 and was the first of two massacres at the town. The second attack came almost exactly nineteen years later in November, 1776. Not much is known except for the deaths of thirty-one men, women and children, as well as Jesuit missionaries.

See also
Capture of Tucson (1846)
Capture of Tucson (1862)
American Indian Wars
Apache Wars
Navajo Wars

References
 Bancroft, Hubert Howe, 1888, History of Arizona and New Mexico, 1530–1888. The History Company, San Francisco.  
 Cooper, Evelyn S., 1995, Tucson in Focus: The Buehman Studio. Arizona Historical Society, Tucson..
 Dobyns, Henry F., 1976, Spanish Colonial Tucson. University of Arizona Press, Tucson.. 
 Drachman, Roy P., 1999, From Cowtown to Desert Metropolis: Ninety Years of Arizona Memories. Whitewing Press, San Francisco. .

History of Mexico
1750s in New Spain
Conflicts in 1757
1757 in North America